was a city located in Saitama Prefecture, Japan.

On May 1, 2001, Yono was merged with the cities of Urawa and Ōmiya to create the city of Saitama.

Since April 1, 2003, the area of former Yono City is only consisted of Chūō-ku of Saitama City.

History

Modern Yono
 On April 1, 1889, the town of Yono was founded.
 On July 15, 1958, Yono became a city. The city existed between cities of Urawa and Ōmiya.

Saitama city era
 On May 1, 2001, Yono was merged with the cities Urawa and Ōmiya to create the new capital city of Saitama.
 On April 1, 2003, when Saitama became a designated city, the former area of Yono city became known as Chūō-ku, along with small parts of former Urawa and Ōmiya cities.

Things of Interest
(Saitama New Urban Center's west of Utsunomiya Line.) Also, this is the birthplace of Eiji Kawashima, Kawasaki Frontale's former goalkeeper that is now playing for Racing Club Strasbourg.

External links
 Internet archive of Yono's website

Dissolved municipalities of Saitama Prefecture
Saitama (city)